Hyena (하이에나) is the name of a soundtrack released in 2006 for the Korean drama of the same title, which aired on tvN and starred Kim Min-jong, Yoon Da-hoon, Oh Man-seok and Shin Sung-rok.

Track listing
 The Night Chicago Died - Super Junior-K.R.Y.
 Go! Go! - TRAX
 한 사람만을 (The One I Love) - Super Junior-K.R.Y.
 0 (영 ; 零) - Seo Hyun-jin
 Smile - Kyuhyun (Super Junior)
 Bossa Cha Cha - Lee Yoon-jae
 My Tears - TRAX
 그대 떠나가는 길에 (You Go Away on the Road) - Chu Ga-yeoul
 Drive
 한 사람만을 (The One I Love) (Instrumental)

External links
 tvN's official website 

Soundtracks by South Korean artists
2006 soundtrack albums
Television soundtracks
SM Entertainment soundtracks
K-pop albums
Jazz soundtracks
Blues soundtracks